Josef Karl Richter (16 March 1880 in Podersam22 September 1933 in Vienna) was a Bohemian composer and military bandmaster.

Richter was the son of a court official. He studied music and graduated in 1898. In the same year he joined the military band of the Infantry Regiment No. 74 and stayed there until 1901. During World War I he served as a medical orderly in the Austro-Hungarian Army and was promoted to sergeant major in 1916. From 1918 to 1920 he was conductor of the "Volkswehr battalion no. 6" in Vienna. From 1920 to 1924 he was conductor of the "Brigade-Musik" in Vienna. In 1924 was appointed bandmaster of the Infantry Regiment No. 4. He remained in this position until 1932. He was a close friend of Franz Lehár and adapted many of his works for concert band.

Works 
Richter composed mostly marches, dance and light music for concert band.

 Heimkehr, march
 Heldentotenlied, in five movements for baritone and concert band
 Jung Deutschmeister, march
 Requiem, for male choir and concert band
 Romanze nr. 2, for concert band
 Romanze nr. 3, for concert band
 Sangesbrüder, march
 Semendria, march
 Treue Kameraden, march
 Zum Ausmarsch bereit, march

References 
 Wolfgang Suppan, Armin Suppan: Das Neue Lexikon des Blasmusikwesens, 4. Auflage, Freiburg-Tiengen, Blasmusikverlag Schulz GmbH, 1994, 
 Wolfgang Suppan: Das neue Lexikon des Blasmusikwesens, 3. Auflage, Freiburg-Tiengen, Blasmusikverlag Schulz GmbH, 1988, 
 Wolfgang Suppan: Lexikon des Blasmusikwesens, 2. ergänzte und erweiterte Auflage, Freiburg-Tiengen, Blasmusikverlag Fritz Schulz, 1976
 Paul E. Bierley, William H. Rehrig: The heritage encyclopedia of band music : composers and their music, Westerville, Ohio: Integrity Press, 1991, 
 R. Stanek: Josef Karl Richter - ein Freund F. Lehárs, in: Österreichische Blasmusik nr. 22, 1974, n. 2
 Illustrierte Kronen-Zeitung of 24 and 26 September 1933

External links
 

1880 births
1933 deaths
19th-century composers
19th-century Czech male musicians
19th-century Czech people
20th-century composers
20th-century Czech male musicians
20th-century Czech people
Austro-Hungarian military personnel of World War I
Czech composers
Czech male composers
Czech military musicians
Austrian musicians